Lewistown Township is one of twenty-six townships in Fulton County, Illinois, USA.  As of the 2010 census, its population was 3,039 and it contained 1,444 housing units.

Geography

Cities, towns, villages
 Lewistown

Unincorporated towns
 Depler Springs
(This list is based on USGS data and may include former settlements.)

Cemeteries
The township contains these four cemeteries: McNeil, Oak Hill, Saint Marys and Wright.

Major highways
  US Route 24
  Illinois Route 97
  Illinois Route 100

Demographics

School districts
 Lewistown School District 97

Political districts
 Illinois's 17th congressional district
 State House District 91
 State Senate District 46

References
 
 United States Census Bureau 2007 TIGER/Line Shapefiles
 United States National Atlas

External links
 City-Data.com
 Illinois State Archives

Townships in Fulton County, Illinois
Townships in Illinois